The 1962 America's Cup, the second to be sailed in 12-metre yachts, marked the first challenge for the Cup from a country other than Great Britain or Canada, and was the first challenge from a country in the southern hemisphere. An Australian syndicate headed by Sir Frank Packer, representing the Royal Sydney Yacht Squadron, challenged with their yacht Gretel.  Although the New York Yacht Club won the regatta four races to one represented by the yacht Weatherly, the challenger, Gretel won the second race, beating the Americans for the first time since the 1930s, and only lost the fourth race by twenty-six seconds. The NYYC was so shocked at the closeness of the contest that they immediately changed the rules to ban the use of American design and technology by Cup challengers.

Defender Series
The NYYC ran a regatta to determine the yacht they would name as defender in the match. Competing were Weatherly, with Emil (Bus) Mosbacher, Jr. at the helm, Easterner, Columbia, skippered by Paul V. Shields, and Nefertiti, helmed by sailmaker and naval architect Ted Hood. Weatherly was chosen as the defender.

Weatherly
Weatherly (USA-17) was designed by Philip Rhodes, built by Luders Marine Construction Company at Stamford, Connecticut, USA, and owned by a syndicate headed by Henry D. Mercer, Cornelius Walsh, and Arnold D. Frese. The boat was built for the trials for the 1958 America's Cup but had performed poorly. For the 1962 trials, Weatherly was extensively modified by shortening the bow, reducing the wetted surface area, reducing weight wherever possible and moving the weight saved to increase the weight of the keel.

Gretel
Gretel (KA-1) was the first Australian 12-meter. She was designed by Alan Payne, built at Lars Halvorsen Sons Pty. Ltd., and owned by a syndicate headed by Sir Frank Packer plus Richard Dickson, William H. Northam, William G. Walkley, and Noel Foley. She was helmed by Jock Sturrock.

The races

References

External links
 The Gretel's Brush with the Cuban Missile Crisis at History in Pieces
 Weatherly article at AC-Cyclopaedia
 Gretel article at AC-Cyclopaedia
 

 
1962
A
1962 in sailing
12-metre class